Inside Out is a 2015 American computer-animated film directed by Pete Docter from a screenplay he co-wrote with Meg LeFauve and Josh Cooley. Produced by Pixar Animation Studios, it stars the voices of Amy Poehler, Phyllis Smith, Richard Kind, Bill Hader, Lewis Black, Mindy Kaling, Kaitlyn Dias, Diane Lane, and Kyle MacLachlan. The film follows the inner workings inside the mind of a young girl named Riley, who adapts to her family's relocation, as five personified emotions administer her thoughts and actions.

Inside Out debuted out of competition at the 68th Cannes Film Festival on May 18, 2015, and was released in the United States on June 19. Made on a production budget of $175million, Inside Out earned $858.8million worldwide, finishing its theatrical run as the seventh-highest-grossing film of 2015. On the review aggregator website Rotten Tomatoes, the film holds an approval rating of  based on  reviews.

The film has received various awards and nominations. It won Best Animated Feature Film at the 73rd Golden Globe Awards. The film won ten of fourteen nominations at the 43rd Annie Awards. At the 88th Academy Awards, it received two Oscar nominations, including Best Original Screenplay, and won for Best Animated Feature. Inside Out was named one of the ten best films of 2015 by the National Board of Review (where it also won Best Animated Film) and the American Film Institute. Various critic circles have also picked it as the best animated feature film of the year.

Accolades

Notes

References

External links
 

Lists of accolades by film
Pixar awards and nominations